Candice Parise is a French actress and singer.

Biography 
Candice Parise studied acting in an American school in Paris, singing at CIM Jazz school and dancing at School Rick Odums.

In 2006, she represented Paris/Île-de-France/Centre at the French Eurovision Song Contest and finished in the last five candidates.

She created her own jazz band called the Parise' Jazz Quintet and also became the lead singer of the Rive Droite Rive Gauche jazz band with which she edited two albums and won several awards at the Megève Jazz Festival.

In 2009, Candice joined the London School of Musical Theatre. Since her graduation, she has played in several musicals in Europe and Asia in French and English : Hair, Notre-Dame de Paris, Les Misérables, Songs for a New World

Musicals 
 2003 : West Side Story by Leonard Bernstein and Stephen Sondheim, dir Ron Schaeffer – French Woods Festival of the Performing Arts, Hancock, New York
 2003 :   On passe dans trois jours by Sacha Guitry, dir J.Léonhardt – Rocquencourt :  Fanny Talmont
 2004 : Promesses, Creation Ondines/Teixeira – Versailles
 2004 : 8 Women from François Ozon's movie by E. Favre – Versailles : Augustine
 2004 : This fate's whore by J.Amara Ross – Paris
 2010 : Mr Christmas by Charles Miller and Kevin Hammonds – UK Premiere
 2010 : City of Angels by Cy Coleman and David Zippel, dir Graham Hubbard – London : Priscilla
 2010 : Les Misérables by Claude-Michel Schönberg and Alain Boublil, dir Adrian Sarple – London : Fantine
 2010–2011 : Hair by Galt MacDermot, Gerome Ragni and James Rado, dir Sylvain Meyniac – Paris, tour : Crissy
 2011–2012 : Notre-Dame de Paris by Richard Cocciante and Luc Plamondon, dir Gilles Maheu – China, Korea : Esmeralda
 2012–2013 : Roméo et Juliette by and dir Gérard Presgurvic – Japan, China : Juliette
 2013–2014 : Songs for a New World by Jason Robert Brown, dir Frédérique Lelaure – Paris : Woman 1 
 2014–2015 : Piano-Plage, dir Nathalie Stas – Paris, Belgium : Mi
 2014–2015 : The Wizard of Oz, by Andrew Lloyd Webber, dir Jeremy Sams – Palais des Congrès de Paris, tour : Dorothy
 2015–2016 : Holiday on Ice (BELIEVE), – Zénith Paris, tour : Clarissa Official Lead Singer
 2016–2017 : The Voice 6 France', Team: Florent Pagny

Discography

Albums 
 2011 : La Belle vie by Rive Droite Rive Gauche Swing Band 
 2013 : Swingin from Paris to Chicago by Rive Droite Rive Gauche Swing Band

Awards 
 Megève Jazz Contest 2009 : People's choice with the band Rive Droite Rive Gauche
 Megève Jazz Contest 2011 : People's choice with the band Rive Droite Rive Gauche
 Megève Jazz Contest 2013 : People's choice with the band Rive Droite Rive Gauche

References

External links 
 Official site

Living people
French women singers
Eurovision Song Contest entrants for France
Year of birth missing (living people)